Acropentias papuensis is a moth in the family Crambidae. It was described by George Hampson in 1919. It is found in New Guinea.

The wingspan is about 22 mm. The forewings are pale fulvous brown with slight dark irroration (sprinkling). The hindwings are white, tinged with fulvous brown.

References

Moths described in 1919
Pyraustinae
Moths of New Guinea